David was a monk, bishop and historian of the Church of the East in the 7th or 8th century.

Originally a monk of Beth Abe, he later became the bishop of the Kurdish tribes in the region of Kartaw. This region was located in Upper Mesopotamia, in the north of Adiabene, west of the Lower Zab and north of Erbil. He was writing no earlier than the reign of Hnanisho I, patriarch of the Church of the East from 686 to 698.

David wrote in Syriac a work known as the Little Paradise to distinguish it from the Paradise of the Fathers of Palladius of Galatia and the Paradise of the Orientals of Joseph Hazzaya. It is presumed lost. According to Thomas of Marga in chapter XXI of his Book of Governors, David wrote at the request of a Persian nobleman named Khuznahir, a Christian from Bashosh (near Shalmash). The Little Paradise was a series of "histories" of Mesopotamian ascetics beginning with George bar Sayyadhe, who was the ninth abbot of Beth Abe in 590. It certainly also contained biographies of the next four abbots of Beth Abe: George's brother and successor, Sama of Neshra; Nathaniel; Selibha the Aramaean; and Gabriel, called the Little Sparrow, who flourished in the late seventh century. It does not appear to have been an extensive work, more probably having a "bite-size, compilatory structure." It was probably conceived as a companion volume to Enanisho's Syriac edition of Palladius. Thomas of Marga cites it in his chapter XXIV concerning a famine that took place during the youth of John of Daylam. David's work is also cited in the metrical history of Beth Qoqa by John bar Zobi.

Several modern authors identify the David who was bishop of the Kurds and author of the Little Paradise with David of Beth Rabban, who was active during the reign of Timothy I (780–823). Carl Anton Baumstark and Sebastian Brock, however, clearly distinguish the two.

Notes

Bibliography

 Published online by Beth Mardutho, 2018.

8th-century historians
Monks of the Church of the East
Church of the East writers
Syriac writers
History of the Kurdish people
7th-century biographers